Bakkwa, also known as rougan, is a Chinese salty-sweet dried meat product similar to jerky.

Bakkwa is made with a meat preservation and preparation technique originating from China. The general method of production has remained virtually unchanged throughout the centuries, but the techniques have been gradually improved.

Nowadays, products with a softer texture, lighter color and less sugar are preferred. The  type of bakkwa products has a higher water content, and thus has a softer texture and lower sugar content. Whereas the traditional bakkwa has a water activity below 0.7,  bakkwa tends to be closer to a water activity of about 0.79. Nevertheless,  can have a similar shelf life to other types of bakkwa.

Bakkwa is very popular in Singapore and Malaysia where it is traditionally eaten during the Chinese New Year. When Chinese immigrants brought this delicacy over to Singapore and Malaysia, it began to take on local characteristics. A notable example lies in the preparation of bakkwa, where the meat is grilled over charcoal rather than air-dried, imparting a smokier flavor to the meat. The Singaporean and Malaysian versions of bakkwa are also sweeter than their mainland China counterparts with many different variations having developed to suit local palates, such as chili bakkwa.

See also
Bee Cheng Hiang
Dendeng
Dried shredded squid
Rousong

References

External links

Chinese New Year foods
Dried meat
Hong Kong cuisine
Indonesian cuisine
Macau cuisine
Malaysian cuisine
Singaporean cuisine
Taiwanese cuisine
Chinese meat dishes